The Anglo-Egyptian Slave Trade Convention, also known as Anglo-Egyptian Convention for the Suppression of the Slave Trade or Anglo-Egyptian Convention for the Abolition of Slavery was a treaty between Great Britain and the Khedivate of Egypt from 1877. The first version of 1877 was followed by an addition in 1884. It formally banned the slave trade to Egypt. 

The treaty of 1877 officially banned the slave trade to Sudan, thus formally putting an end on the import of slaves from Sudan. 
Sudan was at this time the main import of male slaves to Egypt. This ban was followed in 1884 by a ban on the import of white women; this law was directed against the import of white women (mainly from Caucasus and usually Circassians), which were the preferred choice for harem concubines among the Egyptian upper class.  

The import of male slaves from Sudan as soldiers, civil service and eunuchs, as well as the import of female slaves from Caucasus as harem women were the two main sources of slave import to Egypt, thus these laws were, at least on paper, major blows on Slavery in Egypt.  Slavery itself was not banned, only the import of slaves. However a ban on the sale on existing slaves was introduced alongside a law giving existing slaves the legal right to apply for manumission.

References

 Francesca Biancani: Sex Work in Colonial Egypt: Women, Modernity and the Global Economy
 Seong Hyun Kim: A Comparative Study of Anti-Slavery in 19th Century Middle East and North Africa: The Cases of the Egyptian Khedivate and the Husaynid Beylik of Tunis 
 Diane Robinson-Dunn: The Harem, Slavery and British Imperial Culture: Anglo-Muslim Relations in
1877 in Africa
Anti-slavery treaties
Abolitionism in Africa
Slavery in Egypt
Slavery in Sudan

1877 in Egypt
1877 in the British Empire
1877 treaties
1884 in Egypt
1884 in the British Empire
1884 treaties
Treaties of the Khedivate of Egypt
Treaties of the United Kingdom (1801–1922)
African slave trade
Egypt–United Kingdom relations